This is a list of high schools in the state of Wyoming.

Albany County
 Rock River High School, Rock River

Laramie 

Laramie High School
Whiting High School

Big Horn County

Burlington High School, Burlington
Greybull High School, Greybull
Lovell High School, Lovell
Riverside High School, Basin
Rocky Mountain High School, Cowley

Campbell County
Wright Junior & Senior High School, Wright

Gillette 

Campbell County High School 
Heritage Christian School (Wyoming)
Thunder Basin High School
Westwood High School

Carbon County

Encampment K-12 School, Encampment
H.E.M. Junior/Senior High School, Hanna
Little Snake River Valley K-12 School, Baggs
Rawlins High School, Rawlins
Saratoga Middle/High School, Saratoga

Converse County

Douglas High School, Douglas
Glenrock High School, Glenrock

Crook County

Hulett K-12 School, Hulett
Moorcroft Secondary School, Moorcroft

Sundance

Bear Lodge Alternative High School
Sundance Secondary School

Fremont County

Arapahoe Charter High School, Arapahoe
Dubois High School, Dubois
Shoshoni High School, Shoshoni
St. Stephens High School, St. Stephens
Wind River Middle/High School, Pavillion
Wyoming Indian High School, Ethete

Fort Washakie

Fort Washakie Charter High School
Wyoming e Academy of Virtual Education

Lander

Lander Valley High School
Pathfinder High School

Riverton

Riverton High School
Frontier Academy

Goshen County

Lingle-Fort Laramie K-12 School, Lingle
Southeast K-12 School, Yoder
Torrington High School, Torrington

Hot Springs County
Hot Springs County High School, Thermopolis

Johnson County

Buffalo High School, Buffalo
Kaycee High School, Kaycee

Laramie County

Burns Junior/Senior High School, Burns 
Pine Bluffs Junior/Senior High School, Pine Bluffs

Cheyenne

Cheyenne Central High School
Cheyenne East High School
Cheyenne South High School
Destiny Christian Academy

Lincoln County
Cokeville High School, Cokeville

Afton

Star Valley High School
Swift Creek High School

Kemmerer

Kemmerer High School
New Frontier High School

Natrona County
Midwest High School, Midwest

Casper

Natrona County High School
Roosevelt High School
Kelly Walsh High School

Niobrara County
Niobrara County High School, Lusk

Park County

 Powell High School, Powell
 Meeteetse K-12 School, Meeteetse

Cody

 Cody High School
Park Christian Schools

Platte County

Chugwater K-12 School, Chugwater
Glendo K-12 School, Glendo
Guernsey-Sunrise Junior/Senior High School, Guernsey
Wheatland High School, Wheatland

Sheridan County

Arvada-Clearmont High School, Clearmont
Big Horn Middle/High School, Big Horn
Tongue River High School, Dayton

Sheridan

Fort Mackenzie High School
Sheridan High School

Sublette County

Big Piney High School, Big Piney
Pinedale High School, Pinedale

Sweetwater County
Farson-Eden K-12 School, Farson

Green River

Expedition Academy High School
Green River High School

Rock Springs

Independence High School
Rock Springs High School

Teton County

Jackson

Jackson Hole Christian Academy
Jackson Hole Classical Academy
Jackson Hole High School
Summit High School (formerly Western Wyoming High School)

Uinta County

Lyman High School, Lyman
Mountain View High School, Mountain View

Evanston

Evanston High School
Horizon Alternative High School

Washakie County

Ten Sleep K-12 School, Ten Sleep
Worland High School, Worland

Weston County

Newcastle High School, Newcastle
Upton High School, Upton

See also 
List of school districts in Wyoming

References

Wyoming
High schools